Rutger Velpius (around 1540–1614/15) was a 16th- and 17th-century printer and bookseller. He was the first printer in the city of Mons, and later became printer to the court in Brussels. His career coincided closely with the first decades of the Dutch Revolt

Life

Leuven
Velpius became a bookseller in Leuven in 1564, and in 1565 was licensed as a "sworn bookseller" to the University of Leuven. Around 1567 he married Catherine Waen, daughter of the Scottish expatriate bookseller John Waen.

In 1570 Velpius was examined and certified as a printer, his certification specifying that he knew Latin, French and Flemish, and a little bit of Greek. For his work in Leuven he used two printer's marks: a large one with a crenellated tower, an angel of vengeance above it and the figures of Justice and Peace embracing before the gates, with the motto Justitia et pax osculate sunt. Psal. 84. (Justice and peace have kissed); and a smaller one showing Justice and Peace kissing with the motto Justitia et pax. In 1578 he was licensed to print the government's decrees.

Mons
In 1580 he relocated to Mons, becoming the first printer to work in the city. The local government equipped a printing workshop at the city's expense. To demonstrate his skill to the city magistrates, Velpius printed Libert Houthem's Kakogeitnia seu mala vicina, libellus, vicinos malos velut catalogo recensens (1580). The first work certainly printed in Mons is Le Renart decouvert (1580), an anonymous satire on William of Orange written by Jean Richardot. Although a native speaker of Dutch, during this period of his life Velpius printed almost exclusively in French.

In 1966 facsimiles of Kakogeitnia and Le Renart decouvert were printed in Mons as a single volume with the title Les premiers livres imprimés à Mons, and with introductions by Christiane Pierard and Pierre Ruelle.

Brussels
In 1585 Velpius relocated again, to Brussels, in the wake of Alexander Farnese, Duke of Parma, by whom he was appointed printer to the court. He established his business in a bookshop called "Den gulden Arend" (The Golden Eagle), opposite the Coudenberg palace. Here he designed a new printer's mark, a two-headed eagle charged with a crucifix, and the motto Sub umbra alarum tuarum protege nos (Protect us in the shadow of your wings). In 1586 he obtained citizenship of the city of Brussels.

Besides decrees and other official pieces he also published a great many occasional pieces and books in several languages. The Royal Library of Belgium catalogues 170 works published by Velpius between 1585 and 1600. In 1588 and 1589 he printed or reprinted a number of news reports from France. In Brussels his output also reflected the interests of courtiers, with a number of Spanish books, particularly on military and religious themes, as well as news pamphlets about Habsburg military victories in the Low Countries and in Hungary.

In 1607 Velpius printed in Spanish Don Quixote, correcting many errors of the first and second edition printed in Madrid in 1605. Unfortunately, these corrections were not included in the third and successive editions elsewhere.

In 1594 his daughter, Catherine, married Hubert Anthoon, and from 1598 Velpius brought his son-in-law into the business, leaving it for him to run after his death in 1614 or 1615. In 1617, Anthoon published the Second Part of Don Quixote (first edition in Madrid in 1615); he also published many other novels and plays in Spanish.

Select list of publications

Decrees and news pamphlets
  (Leuven, 1565) – news of the failure of the Great Siege of Malta
 , 15 May 1587 (Brussels, 1587) – an edict on military justice. Available on Google Books
  (Brussels, 1596) – an account of the taking of Calais
  (Brussels, 1598) – an account of the journey to Italy of Albert VII, Archduke of Austria and Margaret of Austria, Queen of Spain. Available on Google Books
  (Brussels, 1600) – a report of the Battle of Nieuwpoort. Available on Google Books
  (Brussels, 1609) – publication of the ratification of the Twelve Years' Truce. Available on Google Books
 , 27 February 1610 (Brussels, 1610) – an edict against duelling. Available on Google Books

Other works
  (Leuven, 1566)
 Claude de Sainctes,  (Leuven, 1567) Available on Google Books
 Epistolae Japanicae, de multorum gentilium in variis insulis ad Christi fidem per societatis nominis Jesu theologos conversione (Leuven, 1569) Available on Google Books
 (Jean Richardot), Le Renart decouvert (Mons, 1580).
 Jean Bosquet, Fleurs morales et sentences perceptives (Mons, 1581)
 Sancho de Londoño, Discurso sobre la forma de reducir la disciplina militar a mejor y antiguo estado (Brussels, 1587)
 Francisco de Valdés, Espeio, y deceplina militar (Brussels, 1589)
 Pedro Cornejo, Compendio y breve relation de la liga y confederacion francesa (Brussels, 1591)
 Bernardino de Escalante, Dialogos del arte militar (Brussels, 1595)
 Bernardino de Mendoza, Theoricque et practique de guerre (Brussels, 1597) 
 Henri Hornkens, Recueil de Dictionaires Francoys, Espaignolz et Latins (Brussels, 1599) – a combined French-Spanish-Latin dictionary Available on Google Books
 Jacques Blaseus, Sermon funèbre faict par le rév. évesque de Νamur, messire Jacques Blaseus, aux funérailles du trèscatholique, très-hault et trèspuissant Prince et Monarque Philippe 2, Roy des Espaignes, etc., célébrez en Brusselles, en l'Église de Ste Goedele (Brussels, 1599)
 Francesco Petrarca, Le Petrarque en rime francoise, trans. Philippe de Maldeghem (Brussels, 1600)
 Mateo Luján de Sayavedra, Segunda parte de la vida del picaro Guzman de Alfarache (Brussels, 1604) Available on Google Books
 Melchior de Santa Cruz,  (Brussels, 1605) Available on Google Books
 Philip Numan,  (Brussels, 1605)
 Joan Pallet, Dictionaire tres-ample de la langue françoise et espagnole (Brussels, 1606)
 Miguel de Cervantes, El ingenioso hidalgo don Quijote de la Mancha, First Part (Brussels, 1607) 
 Justus Lipsius, Die Heylighe Maghet van Halle, translated by Philip Numan (Brussels, 1607) Available on Google Books
 César Oudin,  (Brussels, 1610) Available on Google Books
 Andres de Soto, translated by Philip Numan (Brussels, 1613) Available on Google Books
Dutch version Twee t'samensprekingen behandelende de leeringe ende materie vanden mirakelen (Brussels, 1614) Available on Google Books

References

Year of birth unknown
Year of death unknown
Businesspeople from Leuven
16th-century printers
17th-century printers
Book publishers (people) of the Spanish Netherlands
Year of birth uncertain